Dorchester County is a county located in the U.S. state of South Carolina. As of the 2020 census, the population was 161,540. Its county seat is St. George.

Dorchester County is included in the Charleston-North Charleston, SC Metropolitan Statistical Area.

History
Dorchester County is named for its first settlement area, which was established by Congregationalists in 1696. These settlers applied the name "Dorchester" after their last residence in Dorchester, Massachusetts.

Dorchester was not established as a separate county until 1897. However, when it was separately established, it came from parts of the neighboring Colleton and Berkeley counties.

Geography

State and local protected areas/sites 
 Colonial Dorchester State Historic Site
 Edisto River Wildlife Management Area
 Givhans Ferry State Park (part)
 Middleton Place

Major water bodies 
 Ashley River
 Four Hole Swamp
 Edisto River

Adjacent counties 
 Bamberg County - west
 Berkeley County - east
 Charleston County - southeast
 Colleton County - southwest
 Orangeburg County - northwest

Major highways

Major infrastructure 
 Summerville Airport

Demographics

2020 census

As of the 2020 United States census, there were 161,540 people, 57,768 households, and 41,473 families residing in the county.

2010 census
At the 2010 census, there were 136,555 people, 50,259 households, and 36,850 families living in the county. The racial makeup of the county was 67.8% white, 25.8% black or African American, 1.5% Asian, 0.7% American Indian, 0.1% Pacific islander, 1.4% from other races, and 2.6% from two or more races. Those of Hispanic or Latino origin made up 4.4% of the population. In terms of ancestry,

Of the 50,259 households, 40.3% had children under the age of 18 living with them, 52.6% were married couples living together, 16.0% had a female householder with no husband present, 26.7% were non-families, and 21.6% of households were made up of individuals. The average household size was 2.68 and the average family size was 3.11. The median age was 35.6 years.

The median household income was $55,034 and the median family income  was $63,847. Males had a median income of $45,659 versus $32,221 for females. The per capita income for the county was $24,497. About 9.0% of families and 11.2% of the population were below the poverty line, including 16.4% of those under age 18 and 9.1% of those age 65 or over.

2000 census
At the 2000 census there were 96,413 people, 34,709 households, and 26,309 families living in the county.  The population density was 168 people per square mile (65/km2).  There were 37,237 housing units at an average density of 65 per square mile (25/km2).  The racial makeup of the county was 71.05% White, 25.08% Black or African American, 0.73% Native American, 1.13% Asian, 0.07% Pacific Islander, 0.59% from other races, and 1.36% from two or more races.  1.79% of the population were Hispanic or Latino of any race.
Of the 34,709 households 40.00% had children under the age of 18 living with them, 57.20% were married couples living together, 14.60% had a female householder with no husband present, and 24.20% were non-families. 20.20% of households were one person and 6.50% were one person aged 65 or older.  The average household size was 2.72 and the average family size was 3.13.

The age distribution was 28.90% under the age of 18, 7.70% from 18 to 24, 31.60% from 25 to 44, 22.60% from 45 to 64, and 9.10% 65 or older.  The median age was 35 years. For every 100 females, there were 95.80 males.  For every 100 females age 18 and over, there were 91.70 males.

The median household income was $43,316 and the median family income  was $50,177. Males had a median income of $35,423 versus $24,405 for females. The per capita income for the county was $18,840.  About 7.10% of families and 9.70% of the population were below the poverty line, including 11.40% of those under age 18 and 13.30% of those age 65 or over.

Law and government
The governing body of Dorchester County was established in 1970, and was known as the Dorchester County Board of Directors with terms to commence in January 1971. Upon commencement, the body was re-titled as the “Dorchester County Council” and its meeting dates were determined by state law to be held the 1st and 3rd Monday of every month. The seven-member County Council is elected by single-member districts. 
Dorchester County operates under the Council-Administrator form of government whereby County Council appoints a County Administrator to oversee the day-to-day functions of county government.  Jason L. Ward has served as the County Administrator since 2004.  He is aided by a Deputy County Administrator and Chief Financial Officer (Daniel T. Prentice), Deputy County Administrator for Public Safety (Mario Formisano), and Assistant County Administrator for Communuity Services (Bryan Havir).  This management team oversees multiple departments within their respective directorate.

In addition to senior management reporting to County Council through the County Administrator, seven Countywide elected officials serve four year terms and oversee the following functions:

Clerk of Court (Cheryl Graham)
Sheriff (L.C. Knight)
Auditor (J.J. Messervy)
Treasurer (Cindy Chitty)
Probate Judge (Mary Blunt)
Coroner (Paul Brouthers)
Register of Deeds (Margaret Bailey)

The South Carolina Department of Corrections operates the Lieber Correctional Institution in Ridgeville in Dorchester County. The prison houses the state's male death row.

Politics

Education
School districts include:
 Dorchester School District 2
 Dorchester School District 4

Communities

City
 North Charleston (largest city in the county, partly in Berkeley County and Charleston County)

Town
 Harleyville
 Lincolnville (mostly in Charleston County)
 Reevesville
 Ridgeville
 St. George (county seat)
 Summerville (partly in Berkeley and Charleston Counties)

Census-designated place
 Ladson (partly in Berkeley County and Charleston County)

Unincorporated communities
 Grover
 Byrds
 Knightsville

Ghost town 

 Dorchester, South Carolina

See also
 List of counties in South Carolina
 National Register of Historic Places listings in Dorchester County, South Carolina
 South Carolina State Parks

References

External links

 
 
 Dorchester County History and Images

 
1897 establishments in South Carolina
Populated places established in 1897
Charleston–North Charleston–Summerville metropolitan area